The Kungsporten Church is a church building in Öxnehaga in Huskvarna, Sweden. Belonging to the Evangelical Free Church in Sweden, it was opened in November 2001.

References

External links
official website 

21st-century Protestant churches
Churches in Jönköping Municipality
Churches completed in 2001
Huskvarna
21st-century churches in Sweden